"Don't Break My Heart" is a 1995 soft rock song by the Belgian band Vaya Con Dios. It was released in 1995 as the first single from the band's fourth studio album Roots and Wings.

Track listings
	 	Don't Break My Heart (Single Version) (3:44)
	 	Movin' On (3:30)
 Written by Cyril Orcel and Dani Klein

Credits
 Written by Dani Klein, James T. Slater, Luc Weisser and Willy Lambregt
 Produced by Philippe Allaert

Charts

References

External links
Don't Break My Heart at Discogs

1995 singles
Vaya Con Dios (band) songs
Songs written by James T. Slater
Songs written by Dani Klein
1995 songs
Ariola Records singles